The Socinian controversy in the Church of England (sometimes called the First Socinian controversy to distinguish it from a debate around 1800 mainly affecting Protestant nonconformists; and also called the Trinitarian controversy) was a theological argument on christology carried out by English theologians for around a decade from 1687. Positions that had remained largely dormant since the death in 1662 of John Biddle, an early Unitarian, were revived and discussed, in pamphlet literature (much of it anonymous).

This controversy was part of a larger debate after the Act of Toleration 1689, which excluded anti-trinitarian beliefs. By the end of the 1690s it had become clear that, for the time being, religious tolerance would not be extended.  Formally, the Blasphemy Act 1697, directed against Unitarians, with religious disabilities against non-trinitarian believers, continued in law and settled the matter until the early nineteenth century. On the other hand, the arguments had become well aired, and the Church of England was shown to be hardly united on the theology. An unintended consequence of strong attacks by theologically orthodox Anglicans, in the longer term, was a resulting greater de facto tolerance extending among English Protestants, after a halt was called to the aggressive stance in particular of William Sherlock. This tolerance, becoming a hallmark of Latitudinarian views as they changed into low church attitudes, worked its way out in controversies of the eighteenth century.

Detailed history
The Socinian argument, of which little had been heard for 25 years, was revived in 1687 by the publication of a ‘Brief History’ of the unitarians, as they from now on often designated themselves (see Stephen Nye). There followed (1689) a sheet of ‘Brief Notes’ on the Athanasian creed (see Thomas Firmin).

These two publications prompted William Sherlock's Vindication (1690) of the doctrine of the Trinity. Shortly afterwards (11 August 1690) the subject was also taken up by John Wallis. The Socinians and others accused Sherlock's ‘Vindication’ of tritheism; and reputedly this work had the effect of making a Socinian of William Manning and an Arian of Thomas Emlyn. Sherlock's position was attacked also by another Anglican, Robert South, with a mixture of irony and invective.

Sherlock's doctrine, as preached at Oxford by Joseph Bingham, was condemned by the hebdomadal council (25 November 1695), as ‘falsa, impia et hæretica’ (false, impious and heretical). Sherlock defended himself in an ‘Examination’ (1696) of the decree.

On 3 February 1696 William III addressed to the hierarchy ‘Directions,’ drawn up by Thomas Tenison, prohibiting the use of ‘all new terms’ relating to the Trinity. In his ‘Present State of the Socinian Controversy’ (1698, but most of it printed 1696) Sherlock in practical terms gave up on the positions that had been impugned.

Literature related to the argument was still voluminous, however, in the period up to 1704. One notable reader and student of the debate was John Locke.

Timeline of publications

References

External links
§7. The spread of Arianism and the First Socinian Controversy. XVI. The Literature of Dissent. Vol. 10. The Age of Johnson. The Cambridge History of English and American Literature: An Encyclopedia in Eighteen Volumes. 1907–21
Chapter 4: Historia monotheistica (Normalized)

Attribution

History of the Church of England